Ptilothyris serangota is a moth in the family Lecithoceridae. It was described by Edward Meyrick in 1932. It is found in the Democratic Republic of the Congo (North Kivu, Équateur) and Uganda.

References

Moths described in 1932
Ptilothyris
Taxa named by Edward Meyrick